François Gerard Marie Léotard (born 26 March 1942, in Cannes) is a retired French politician. Singer and actor Philippe Léotard (1940–2001) was his brother.

Member of the Republican Party, the liberal-conservative component of the Union for French Democracy (UDF), he appeared in the foreground of the political scene in the 1980s. He led a new generation of right-wing politicians, the "renovationmen", who opposed the old right-wing leaders Jacques Chirac and Valéry Giscard d'Estaing.

In 1981, he was selected to be one of the first Young Leaders of the French-American Foundation. His political career started with being elected as the Mayor of Fréjus in 1977. He served two terms as the deputy of Var.

Culture Minister, from 1986 to 1988, he sold the main public TV channel TF1. He returned in the cabinet as Defense Minister, from 1993 to 1995. Supporting the candidacy of Edouard Balladur in the 1995 presidential election, he was dismissed after Chirac's election. Elected president of the UDF in 1996, he could not prevent the split of this confederation two years later with Alain Madelin's secession. This and the party's poor showing in the 1998 regional elections prompted his resignation. After a mission in Macedonia in 2001 as representative of the European Union, he retired from politics. In 2003, he created together with other prominent European personalities the Medbridge Strategy Center, whose goal is to promote dialogue and mutual understanding between Europe and the Middle-East. He has since written several books.

Political career

Governmental functions

Minister of State, minister of Defence : 1993–1995.

Minister of Culture and Communication : 1986–1988.

Electoral mandates

National Assembly of France

Member of the National Assembly of France for Var (department) : 1978–1986 (Became minister in 1986) / 1988–1993 (Became minister in 1993) / 1995–2001 (Resignation). Elected in 1978, reelected in 1981, 1986, 1988, 1993, 1995, 1997.

Regional Council

Regional councillor of Provence-Alpes-Côte d'Azur : 1998–2004.

General Council

General councillor of Var (department) : 1979–1988 (Resignation). Reelected in 1985.

Municipal Council

Mayor of Fréjus : 1977–1997 (Resignation). Reelected in 1983, 1989, 1995.

Municipal councillor of Fréjus : 1977–1997 (Resignation). Reelected in 1983, 1989, 1995.

Political functions

President of the Union for French Democracy : 1996–1998.

President of the Republican Party (France) : 1982–1990 / 1995–1997.

Books 
Léotard wrote also several books including non-fiction and a couple of novels:
 Ma liberté (My freedom) published by Plon, 1995
 Pour l'honneur (For honor) published by B. Grasset, 1997
 La Couleur des femmes (The colour of women) published by Grasset & Fasquelle, 2002
 A mon frère qui n'est pas mort (For my brother who is not dead) published by Grasset & Fasquelle, 2003
 La vie mélancolique des méduses(The melancholic life of Jellyfish) published by Grasset & Fasquelle, 2005
 Ça va mal finir (It's going to end badly) published by Grasset & Fasquelle, 2008

References

See also
www.medbridge.org

1942 births
Living people
People from Cannes
French Ministers of Culture
French Ministers of Defence
École nationale d'administration alumni
French people of Corsican descent
Republican Party (France) politicians
Union for French Democracy politicians
Mayors of places in Provence-Alpes-Côte d'Azur
People from Fréjus
Young Leaders of the French-American Foundation
State ministers of France